The 1986 United States Senate election in Wisconsin was held on November 3, 1986. Incumbent Republican U.S. Senator Bob Kasten won re-election to a second term. This would be the last time a Republican would win a Senate race in Wisconsin until Ron Johnson in 2010.

Democratic primary

Candidates
 Roman R. Blenski, State Senator
 Matthew J. Flynn, former Chair of the Wisconsin Democratic Party
 Ed Garvey, former Deputy Attorney General of Wisconsin and Executive Director of the NFLPA
 Gary George, State Senator

Results

General election

Results

See also 
 1986 United States Senate elections

References 

Wisconsin
1986
1986 Wisconsin elections